Omupo or Omu-ipo is an ancient Igbomina-Yoruba town situated in the southeastern part of Kwara State. It is one of the prominent towns in Ifelodun Local Government Area of the State. It is the headquarters of 34 communities of Omupo District, the headquarters of Omupo/Idofian Area Council of Ifelodun Local Government. Omupo Constituency was also created in 1979 for a representative to the Kwara State House of Assembly.

Location
It is 191 miles (308 km) southwest of Abuja, 24 miles (38 km) southeast of Ilorin, 3 miles (4.8 km) northwest of Ajasse Ipo, 10 miles (15.9 km) northeast of Offa, 138 miles (222 km) northeast of Ibadan and 217 miles (350 km) northeast of Lagos.

History
According to tradition, the early settlers in the town migrated from Ile-Ife, the source of Yoruba nation. The founder was Ikuojenrola Adebari Alomole, the surviving son of Awogbola Olomu Aperan, an Ifá priest and renowned herbalist with metaphysical powers.

Olomu Aperan, the progenitor, was a prince from Obadio royal family, one of the eight autonomous monarchs met in Ile-Ife by Oduduwa – the progenitor of Yoruba race. Olomu Aperan's family spread across two big compounds - Akeran and Ogbonji of Ilare Quarters in Ile-Ife. In these compounds, the male children of the family are called Osomu while the female are called Molomu. Over time, his name became corrupted to Olomu, while Aperan was coined from his compound's name - Akeran.

Olomu Aperan left home in the early 15th Century to protest his denial to ascend the throne of Obadio because he had lost most members of his immediate family to an epidemic. Efforts to persuade him to stay at home because of his advanced age proved abortive, but he was reminded of the repercussion of his defiance on his traditional burial rites should he die while travelling. The implication was that his children would continue to pay the traditional rites over generations, wherever they might settle. He left with his supporters and, after many years in the wilderness, met Fagbamila Ajagun-nla, the first Orangun of Ila (a direct descendant of Oduduwa and the Head of Igbomina Kingdom) at Igbo Ajagun-Nla and settled with him.

During the Bariba war Olomu Aperan, Onikoyi, Olugbon and Aresa were led by Ajagun-nla to fortify Oranmiyan's Army in order to fight the Ibaribas. He also participated in many war expeditions as Orangun's man bearer of Ada Ogbo (a cutlass with mystical powers that showed directions). Because of this, Olomu Aperan became popular with the name as Ologbo or Ologbo-lomono (the mace bearer who knows the way). This is where the name Igbomina was coined.

Migration
After the Bariba war, Ajagun-nla went to a new town called Ila-Yara, but Olomu Aperan remained with Oranmiyan at Oyo Ile. After some time, Olomu Aperan consulted an Ifa oracle, his chief priest was Famuwagun, and it was revealed through Ifa divination that Oyo-Ile would disintegrate. Ifa warned that he should proceed to a new settlement. Wherever he found a plant called  (botanical bell cactus), would be safe, and he should settle there. When Olomu Aperan was leaving Oyo, he received the blessing of the reigning Alafin who presented him a gift of masquerades called Jenju and Owolewa. Jenju was worn by a deaf and dumb from Oyo.

Hence, Olomu Aperan requested for Ogbo cutlass from Orangun to pilot his way to his present settlement Omupo where  was found. Some of his families were left behind at Oyo till the present time, while moved to other locations in Yorubaland. When Olomu was leaving Ile-Ife, he cut a branch of Omo tree as a souvenir and he used it as working stick. He passed the working stick on to his male child called Kujenrola, the only child that survived him, who planted it at Omupo which made him to be known as Alomoole. However, because of the mystical powers, military prowess coupled with his Royal background, they accepted the leadership and authority of Olomu Aperan. River Osin serves as the major source of water.

Revelation about Fulani Invasion
Famuwagun again consulted Ifa and it was revealed that foreigners (Fulani) would invade Yorubaland from Ilorin, therefore Olomu Aperan was directed to propitiate  with the blood of a white horse as sacrifice to protect his town from any external attack. The beef of the horse should be eaten in a big wooden bowl (Opon nla) with white pap by the entire populace. This is attested to in Obara and Okanran meji of Odu Ifa (the sixteen Ifa divinations) which goes thus:

For this reason, Omupo was never attacked either by the Fulani or by any contending powers during the inter-tribal wars in Yorubaland. Omupo was where warriors took refuge for reinforcement, and also for the enhancement of their weapons, which they soaked in a poisonous juice from the  cactus.

Olomu Aperan family
The Olomu Aperan family is very big and spread all over Yorubaland. There was Olomu compound at Oluwole Area in the Lagos Island of Lagos State. From Omu-Ijebu, to Omu-badore and Isomu both in Ogun State to Omu-Oke and Omu-Isale in the present Ekiti State. All these Omu towns have the same appellation Oriki Idile and many other traditions in common. There are Olomu families in Ila-Orangun and Ikirun in the present Osun State.

The Cognomen of Olomu
The cognomen of Olomu goes thus:
 awa lomo bao ri igun ao gbudo sepo bao ri akala ao gbudo soro rara
Omu aperan aperin apefa aperindinlogun

Past and present rulers
Awobimpe - Regent (over 50 years)
Oba Ladubo - 1728–1788
Oba Oyewusi Ayinla - 1788–1832
Oba Makaaye Adungbelogun I - 1832–1858
Oba Oyelegbin - 1858–1876
Olomu Ododo - 1876–1887
Oba Adekanye - 1887–1896
Oba Muhammad - 1896 (seven months)
Oba Awerijaye I - 1896–1908
Oba Adeosun - 1908–1912
Oba Olomu Aderohumu Oyehanbi - 1914–1939
Oba Olomu Buhari - 1939–1947
Oba Afolayan - 1948 (six months)
Oba Erubola Ajiboye Ajide - 1948–1960
Oba Abdullahi Alao (Awerijaye II) - 1960–1974
Oba Jimoh Olarinoye (Makaaye II) - 1974–2009
Oba Yakubu Adebayo Buari (Ilufemiloye II) - 12 June 2010 – present

Major traditional festivals
Like every Yoruba towns, major festivals in Omupo include Oba Agba or Baba Agba and Egungun festivals. There is also the omupo day celebration that take place every Four(4) years.

Religion

Islam
While at Oyo, Kujenrola had a female child called Awobimpe (popularly known as Adesewa or Sewa) she was a very beautiful and sociable woman. She married a Muslim scholar at Oyo who gave her the name Nana Ayisat after she accepted Islam. Even when her father left Oyo, Awobimpe was among those who stayed behind but she later joined her father at Omupo with many Moslems, including her husband. Therefore, she was the Princess who brought Islam to Omupo, and she served as a regent for more than 50 years after the demise of her father. Because she came with a "foreign" religion, she was settled at a place far from the palace which was later to become known as Nana compound till today.

The largest congregation of Moslem faithful ever to be witnessed in any Nigerian Moslem community is the annual Moulud Nabbiyy celebration organised by a renowned Islamic Scholar of Tijaniyyat School of thought, Sheik Mohammad Ayinla Al-Awwal. The event has been taking place in Omupo since 1979.

Christianity
Christianity arrived in Omupo in 1926 through Offa/Igbomina Anglican Diocese. The first primary school in Omupo was established by the Anglican Church in 1942.

Tourist attractions
Tourist attractions include: Omo tree planted by Kujenrola. And a place called Igbo'ta not too far from Nana's compound where Kujenrola was said to have hung a chain like Oduduwa. That chain in the olden days was drawn out to commune with him for assistance during famine or drought.

Projects
The following community projects were commissioned through communal efforts:
 Moslem Community Primary School (1956)
 Piped water (1961)
 Omupo Grammar School (1967)
 Electricity project (1974)
 Cottage Hospital (1981)
 Town Hall (1981)
 Omupo Muslim College (1994)

HRM, Oba Jimoh Aweda Olarinoye (Makaaye II, 1974-2009)
The late Oba Jimoh Aweda Olarinoye was born to the Royal family of Baba Alabi Oyewale by Iya Bigogo Asumowu during the reign of Olomu Aderohunmu Oyehanbi (1914-1939). The young Prince lived his childhood life here in Omupo before he "stowed away" to Lagos in search of greener pasture in 1945. He was a successful businessman in Lagos until he was appointed by the Kwara State Government to succeed his brother, Oba Abdullahi Alao Awerijaiye II in 1974.

By his appointment from the MAKAAYE Ruling House, Oba Jimoh Olarinoye became the 15th Olomu of Omupo and the first Traditional Ruler in the contemporary history of the town to be turbaned by his people in his domain. His predecessors after Oba Oyelegbin (1858-1876) were turbaned in succession by the Emir of Ilorin like every other graded Igbomina/Ekiti Obas in the defunct Ilorin province of the old Northern Region.

Before he ascended the throne of his forefathers, Oba Olarinoye was an activist and one of the movers and shakers of events in Omupo. He worked in collaboration with the likes of Pa Samuel Omoyiola, Sheik Mohammad Awwal (Mukadam), Alh. Abdul-Kareem Aremu Kolawole (Oluoko), Alh. Lawal Kanisuru (Eleree), Alh. Aminu Aweda (Ajinge), Alh. Jimoh Iyanda (Oloko), Alh. Jimoh Otuyo (Dasitolohun), Chief Reuben Olaoti (Councilor), Chief Joshua Adebara and Alh. Karimu Talibi (Ogbele) - all of blessed memory. The list of the pillars behind the throne is long, including those who are still alive. 
Oba Olarinoye had a finger in almost every development-oriented activities ranging from politics, religion, economic and socio-cultural either in Lagos or Omupo. He was the first Chairman of Egbejoda Omupo Muslim Society, which was established in 1967 to coordinate and direct the affairs of Islam in Omupo. He was the Chairman (otherwise known as Giwa) of Egbe Amuludun Omupo and in 1957 the Egbe Ore-Metta of Omupo made him a life Patron. He served in the same capacity to quite a number of such socio-cultural associations of Omupo indigenes in Lagos.

In 1976, he constituted a central working committee for the community called Omupo Descendants' Union, to assist him in the planning, coordination and execution of development programmes in the town. No doubt, by the time the history of book of Omupo is published, Oba Jimoh Aweda Olarinoye's contribution should be written in letters of gold as a King who left his town better than he had met it. He came, he saw and he conquered.

As a natural Ruler, he was a father to all his subjects irrespective of political persuasions, religious leaning, social creed or ethnic affinity. He was an apostle of due process, transparency and fairness without necessarily mortgaging his conscience or compromising his primary responsibility to the government of the day either military or civilian. He strove for the greatest happiness for the greatest number. His reign was peaceful and witnessed appreciable growth and development some of which were:
Electrification project in 1976
Commissioning of a Town Hall in 1981
Commissioning of a Health Centre in 1981, upgraded to a Cottage Hospital by the State Government in 1993
Omupo entered the political lexicon in Kwara State as an Electoral Constituency since 1979.
Omupo became the Headquarters of Omupo/Idofian Area Council of Ifelodun LGA

In the traditional hierarchy in Kwara State, Oba Olarinoye was the first Omupo Monarch to be graded and presented with a Staff-of-Office as Oba of 3rd Class status in 1975 by the Kwara State Government which also graded the Olupo of Ajassepo; Elese of Igbaja; Olofa of Offa and Elerin of Erin-Ile as 2nd Class Obas in the same Gazette but the exercise was abrogated by the administration of Col. Ibrahim Taiwo shortly after.
However, the civilian administration of Alh. Adamu Attah revisited the contentious issue in 1981 and he did justice by re-grading Oba Olarinoye a 3rd Class Oba. Unfortunately, Olomu Olarinoye was not a beneficiary of the Gen. Alwali Jauji Kazir Chieftaincy review exercise of 1994, which saw some of the 2nd Class Obas elevated to 1st Class status. Therefore, in the year 2002, the whole town went agog in jubilation when Oba Olarinoye was promoted to the status of a 2nd class Oba by the civilian administration of late Real Admiral Mohammed Lawal along with Olupako of Share; Elesie of Esie; Olora of Ora; Olusin of Isanlu-Isin; Olosi of Osi and Alofa of Iloffa, to mention just a few.

Oba Olarinoye was a prominent member of the Igbomina/Ekiti Traditional Council sitting at Ajassepo. He was highly respected by his Royal Brothers for his experience, having been on the throne much earlier than most of them. He was regarded as a repository of knowledge, a "walking and talking" encyclopedia of Traditional politics in Igbomina/Ekitiland. These attributes made his opinion on important policy issues not only relevant and sought for, but also respected before the Council took decisions. 
Olomu (as was fondly called by his colleagues) was known for forthrightness, bluntness, astuteness and honesty. The Ifelodun Local Government Council would never forget him in a hurry for his advisory roles on very volatile and knotty issues because Oba Jimoh Aweda Olarinoye did not know how to call a spade by another name. He was seen in some quarters as "stubborn" and "heady" because he was an Oba who never prepared to do anything that would bring public odium to his exalted office as a Custodian of customs and tradition of the people of Omupo. He was always on the side of truth and justice not minding whose ox was gored.
As the Paramount Ruler in Omupo District, Oba Olarinoye had a good inter-personal and inter-communal relationship with the Traditional Leaders and people in the 34 communities in Omupoland. He loved his people and his people loved him. 
Oba Olarinoye joined his ancestors in the early hours of Thursday, April 30, 2009 at the age of 94. Four wives, 22 children, many grandchildren and great-grandchildren survived him.

Oba Yakubu Adebayo (Buari II) - 2010-to date
Oba Yakubu Adebayo Buari (Ilufemiloye II) was born in Omupo on 1 January 1952 to the royal lineage of Olomu Mohmmed Suleiman Buari, the twelfth Olomu of Omupo. He had his primary and secondary education in Nigeria and his post-graduate education at the London School of Accountancy in the United Kingdom. He has a Master's of Business Administration (MBA) degree from the University of Ilorin.

He has to his credit over 30 years in the banking and financial industry and has spent more than 35 years in Senior management positions. His work experience spans through Barclays Bank, Kwara State Schools Board, Guinness Nigeria Plc, Bauchi State Investment and Property Development Company Limited, Trade Bank, B-square Consultants, O.A. Group, OAK Group among others. At the Bauchi State Investments & Properties Development Company Limited, he was the Chief Accountant before he joined the services of the Trade Bank Plc as an Assistant General Manager at the Bank's head office in Ilorin.

As a mark of his integrity and demonstrated competence, Oba Buari represented the interest of the Trade Bank on the Board of Biomedical Company Limited as an Executive Director in charge of Administration and Finance. He left the employment of Trade Bank Plc in 1993 after 6 years of meritorious service and became a co-founder and Partner in Bayo Buari & Co (Chartered Accountants).

He was at different times an Associate Lecturer at the Federal Polytechnic, Bauchi, the University of Ilorin, The Chartered Institute of Bankers of Nigeria (CIBN) and the Institute of Chartered Accountants of Nigeria (ICAN). He had also served as External Examiner for Banking & Finance and Accountancy courses to the Kwara Polytechnic, Ilorin.

Oba Adebayo Buari's membership of various local and international professional bodies are the hallmarks of his quest for knowledge and expertise in the areas of human and materials management, Accountancy and Banking. He is a Fellow and Associate of several Accountancy, Banking and Management Institutes, viz. FCA, FCMA, FCIS, FCTI, ACIB, ACIM, AMNIM.

As a demonstration of his versatility in knowledge-sharing, Oba Adebayo Buari has presented seminar papers on topical issues in his field of core competences (Accounting, Banking, Information Technology, Administration and Business Management) across Nigeria, and he has to his credit, a publication titled “Introduction to Value Added Tax in Nigeria, which he co-authored in 1994.

Oba Yakubu Adebayo Buhari is bringing to the leadership of Omupo and its people not only his wealth of experience from the corporate world, but his humanness, integrity and sense of purpose, which are critical for the upliftment of his people.

Upon his selection by the Traditional Kingmakers of the Town, Governor Abubakar 'Bukola Saraki of Kwara State confirmed and approved the selection of Oba Adebayo Buari as the Olomu of Omupo with effect from 1 May 2010. This was followed by the traditional turbaning, which took place on Saturday, 8 May 2010 at a colourful ceremony.

Oba Yakubu Adebayo Buhari is happily married and he is blessed with Princes and Princesses.

References

External links

 The Growth of Islam in Pre-colonial Igbomina, informaworld.com
 Omupo Map — Satellite Images of Omupo. maplandia.com
 Ifelodun Local Government Area. kwarastate.gov.ng
 Omupo, Nigeria. fallingrain.com

Populated places in Kwara State
Towns in Yorubaland